Leandro de Oliveira da Luz (born 3 March 1983), known as simply Leandro, is a Brazilian retired footballer who played as an attacking midfielder.

Hải Phòng FC
Although Leandro played as a left-back in Brazil and Russia, he played as a creative midfielder for Hải Phòng, where he was captain and earned the nickname King Leandro from the supporters.

In 2009, Leandro was voted the V-League's best player in an unofficial poll on the V-League website.

Leandro signed for V-League side Bình Dương F.C. in 2010.

International career

Leandro played four matches for the Brazil Olympic squad at the Pan American Games in Santo Domingo in 2003. He scored a goal on August 3 in the 4–0 victory by Brazil over Colombia.

Honours

Club
Santos
Campeonato Brasileiro Série A: 2002
Paysandu
Campeonato Paraense: 2005

Individual
Singhtarua
 Thai Division 1 League The Golden Boot awarded (1): 2013 (24 goals)

External links
 Player page on Sambafoot

References

1983 births
Living people
Brazilian footballers
Santos FC players
Brasiliense Futebol Clube players
Paysandu Sport Club players
Associação Atlética Ponte Preta players
Associação Desportiva Cabofriense players
FC Saturn Ramenskoye players
Port F.C. players
BG Pathum United F.C. players
Super Power Samut Prakan F.C. players
PTT Rayong F.C. players
União Esporte Clube players
Thai League 1 players
Thai League 2 players
Russian Premier League players
Brazilian expatriate footballers
Expatriate footballers in Russia
Expatriate footballers in Vietnam
Expatriate footballers in Thailand
Association football forwards 
Association football midfielders
Pan American Games silver medalists for Brazil
Footballers at the 2003 Pan American Games
Medalists at the 2003 Pan American Games
Pan American Games medalists in football